The Greater Baltimore Theater Awards are theater awards to recognize excellence in the professional theater in the Greater Baltimore, Maryland (USA) area since 2004. 

 Performances must take place in Baltimore City, Baltimore County, Anne Arundel County or Howard County, Maryland.
 There must be at least four performances.
 Performances must be open to the public 
 At least 50% of the cast must reside in the State of Maryland or the District of Columbia 
 The production can not be produced by an educational institution by and for students of that institution

Awards
Awards are given in the following categories:

 Outstanding Play (three awards)
 Outstanding Actress (three awards)
 Outstanding Actor (three awards)
 Outstanding Director (three awards)
 Outstanding Costume Design (one award)
 Outstanding Scenic Design (one award)
 Outstanding Experimental Production (one award)

2006 Award Winners
2006
Outstanding Play     
 Opus- The Everyman Theatre 
 King Lear Chesapeake Shakespeare Company 
 Faith Healer- Performance Workshop Theatre
 
Outstanding Actress
 Megan Anderson, The Cripple of Inishmaan- The Everyman Theatre 
 Nancy Asendorf, Ragtime- Toby's Dinner Theatre of Baltimore  
 Kathrine Lyons, Faith Healer- Performance Workshop Theatre

      
Outstanding Actor     
James Denvil, Candida- The Everyman Theatre 
 BJ Gailey, Taming of the Shrew- Chesapeake Shakespeare Company 
 Bruce Nelson, School for Scandal- The Everyman Theatre 

      
Outstanding Direction     

 Vincent Lancisi, School for Scandal The Everyman Theatre 
 John Vreeke, Opus- The Everyman Theatre
 Alex Willis, The Goat- Mobtown Players
 
      
Outstanding Scene Design   
 Daniel Ettinger, TinTypes- Rep Stage 
      
Outstanding Costume Design  
 Gail Stewart Beach, School for Scandal- The Everyman Theatre

Outstanding Experimental Production
 Variations on Fear- Run of the Mill

Past Award Winners 
2005
Outstanding Play     
 Frankie & Johnny...- The Everyman Theatre 
 Kimberly Akimbo- Rep Stage 
 Turn of the Screw- Fells Point Corner Theater 
 
Outstanding Actress
 Deborah Hazlett, Frankie and Johnnie...- The Everyman Theatre 
 Helen Hedman, Kimberly Akimbo- Rep Stage 
 Dawn Ursula, Yellowman- The Everyman Theatre 
      
Outstanding Actor     
 Patrick Kilpatrick, A Midsummer Night's Dream- Chesapeake Shakespeare Company 
 Patrick Martyn, House of Blue Leaves- Fells Point Corner Theater 
 Lance Coadie Williams, The Children's Hour- Rep Stage/ The Everyman Theatre 
      
Outstanding Direction     
 Kasi Campbell, Kimberly Akimbo- Rep Stage 
 Vincent Lancisi, Frankie & Johnny...- The Everyman Theatre 
 Craig Allen Mummey, Assassins- Colonial Players 
      
Outstanding Scene Design   
 Lewis Shaw, Romeo and Juliet- Baltimore Shakespeare Festival 
      
Outstanding Costume Design  
 Kristina Lambdin and Jeanne Robin, A Midsummer Night's Dream- Chesapeake Shakespeare Company 

Outstanding Experimental Production
 Variations on Desire- Run of the Mill 

2004
Outstanding Play  
 Arcadia- Rep Stage
 Much Ado About Nothing- Chesapeake Shakespeare Company
 Proof- The Everyman Theatre
  	  	 
Outstanding Actor 	  	 
 Mitchell Hebert, Uncle Vanya-	The Everyman Theatre
 Karl Miller, Arcadia-	Rep Stage
 Jordan Siebert, Hedwig and the Angry Inch- Mobtown Players
  	  	 
Outstanding Actress 	  	 
 Megan Anderson, Proof- Everyman Theatre
 Valerie Fenton, Much Ado About Nothing- Chesapeake Shakespeare Company
 Janine Gulisano, Miss Saigon- Toby's Dinner Theatre
  	  	 
Outstanding Director 	  	 
 Vincent Lancisi, Proof- The Everyman Theatre
 Terry Long, Hedwig and the Angry Inch- Mobtown Players
 Rob McQuay and Toby Orenstein, Godspell- Toby's Dinner Theatre
  	  	 
Outstanding Design 	  	 
 Tony Cisek, Kathleen Geldard & Dan Covey, The Seagull- Rep Stage
 Ed Zarkowski & Tony Gallahan,	Hedwig and the Angry Inch- Mobtown Players
 John Raley, Debra Kim Sivigny & Scott Rosenfeld, Julius Caesar- Baltimore Shakespeare Festival
  	  	 
Experimental Production  	 
 Hedwig and the Angry Inch- Mobtown Players

External links
The Greater Baltimore Theater Awards

American theater awards